Sir William N. Fraser,  (18 February 1816 – 13 March 1898) was a solicitor and notable expert in ancient Scottish history, palaeography, and genealogy.

Life
Fraser's family came of the stock of farmers and craftsmen in The Mearns. He was born the eldest of two sons and a daughter of James Fraser (1786 – 1834), a mason, and his spouse Ann (died 1821), daughter of James Walker, tenant of the farm of Elfhill of Fetteresso, about 5 miles from Stonehaven. The couple were settled and were feuholders at Links of Arduthie.

William Fraser was initially educated at a private school in Stonehaven kept by the Reverend Charles Michie, a M.A. graduate of Aberdeen's Marischal College in 1810, who spent his life teaching.

On 23 August 1830, Fraser began a five-year apprenticeship with Messrs., Brand and Burnett, solicitors in Stonehaven. He went to Edinburgh in December 1835, where he joined the firm of Hill and Tod, Writers to Her Majesty's Signet. He continued his education at Edinburgh University in Scots Law and conveyancing. In 1838 he was taking classes in French.

It was his good fortune to be subsequently concerned in various cases requiring antiquarian and, in particular, genealogical research, and he was thus early introduced to those studies in which he became such an expert, and steadily built up a remarkable body of knowledge which made possible his great series of fifty or so volumes on the histories of between twenty and thirty of the leading noble and landed families of Scotland.

Fraser was frequently summoned to London to give evidence before the Committee for Privileges of the House of Lords. In 1882 the University of Edinburgh conferred on him the honorary degree of LL.D. In 1885 he was created a Companion of the Order of the Bath and in 1887 he was made a Civil Knight Commander of the Bath, being invested by Queen Victoria at Osborne House on 2 August that year. The knighthood was a unique distinction for a Scottish historian at that time.

An article in the Dundee Advertiser on 1 June 1896, stated: "There is no Scotsman living who has so much experience in deciphering ancient documents, nor one who can so skillfully extract information from faded and time-worn parchments" as Sir William Fraser.

Sir William Fraser died three months after his sister Ann, who had kept house for him since 1846. They share a highly unusual and ornate grave, designed by the architect Arthur Forman Paul, in Dean Cemetery in Edinburgh just south of the northmost path in the north section of the original cemetery.

Legacy

The Sir William Fraser Chair of Scottish History and Palaeography at the University of Edinburgh, founded in 1901, is the oldest chair of Scottish History. The professorship was named after and endowed by Sir William Fraser, who gave the university £25,000 for it. The chair has been held by a number of distinguished historians.

In his will he also endowed the Fraser Homes at Colinton (Edinburgh) for "authors or artists in necessitous circumstances."

He also left money for "printing works which would tend to elucidate the history and antiquities of Scotland." The nine-volume book series, The Scots Peerage (1904–1914), by Sir James Balfour Paul, was used for that purpose and is dedicated to him.

Sir William Fraser Chair of Scottish History and Palaeography professors
Peter Hume Brown 1901-1918
Robert Kerr Hannay 1919-1940
William Croft Dickinson 1940-1963
Gordon Donaldson 1963-1979
Geoffrey W.S. Barrow 1979-1992
Michael Lynch 1993-2005
Tom M Devine 2006-2011
 Ewen A. Cameron 2012-

Works
Fraser's writings include:

References

Attribution

 Donaldson, Gordon, Sir William Fraser – The Man and His Work, Edinburgh, 1985,

External links
 
 

1816 births
1898 deaths
19th-century Scottish historians
Alumni of the University of Edinburgh
Knights Commander of the Order of the Bath
People from Kincardine and Mearns
Scottish genealogists
Historians of Scotland
Scottish solicitors